The All-China Sports Federation is a national non-governmental, non-profit sports organization in China. It oversees a wide array of sports associations in the country.

It is responsible to the State General Administration of Sports and the Ministry of Civil Affairs.

See also
 Chinese Olympic Committee

References

External links 
 Official website

 
Sports